Kingscourt railway station is a former passenger and freight station in Kingscourt, County Cavan, Ireland.

In 1888, the company was purchased by the Midland Great Western Railway. (A line from Castleblayney to Armagh, via Keady, was eventually built in the early 1900s and operated by the Great Northern Railway (Ireland).) 

Following the creation of the Irish Free State, the MGWR became part of the Great Southern Railways in 1925, which in turn became part of Córas Iompair Éireann (CIÉ) in 1945. In 1947, CIÉ withdrew passenger services between Kingscourt and Navan.

After a strike by Irish Rail staff in 2001, Gypsum Industries decided to transfer its traffic to road. The last gypsum train departed Kingscourt on 30 October 2001. The last train of all to operate to and from Kingscourt was a weed-spraying train on 7 June 2002, after which the line was disconnected at Tara Junction in Navan.

The station building at Kingscourt remains intact today, having been partially restored in the mid-2000s. Also still extant are the station's single platform, the gypsum terminal and a goods shed. The tracks also remain in situ, albeit heavily overgrown.

References

Disused railway stations in County Cavan
Railway stations opened in 1865
Railway stations closed in 2001
Railway Station, Kingscourt